École secondaire publique De La Salle is a French public junior high and high school in Lowertown Ottawa, Ontario under the CÉPEO (Conseil des Écoles Publiques de l'Est de l'Ontario). 
It is recognized mainly for its artistic excellence program: the Centre d'Excellence Artistique de l'Ontario (CEAO).

History
École secondaire publique De La Salle opened in the fall of 1971 with students from Mont St-Joseph convent, Rideau Street convent and Académie De La Salle.  Just like Académie De La Salle, École secondaire publique De La Salle was named after Saint Jean-Baptiste de la Salle.

In 1982, a study committee recommended the creation of an enrichment centre in Ottawa for gifted students. The committee also recommended that this centre be created and integrated at École secondaire publique De La Salle.

In 1983, De La Salle opened le Centre de Douance (a program for gifted students) and le Centre d'Excellence Artistique de l'Ontario (a program geared towards artistic achievers).  De La Salle became the first school in Ontario to offers those programs in French.

In 2003, De La Salle opened its doors to Grades 7-8. Most of the second floor of the school is exclusively for Grades 7-8, except for one hallway which is reserved for the music concentration and the auditorium, whose main access point is on the second floor.

In 2021, De La Salle invested into a brand new building attached to the old one that took around 20 months of work to build from scratch. The new building contains 8 more classrooms, 1 more gym, 2 professional studios for the arts department and a musculation room.

Centre d'excellence artistique de l'Ontario
The Centre d'excellence artistique de l'Ontario includes 8 arts concentrations from Grade 8 to Grade 12, and a pre-concentration program in Grade 7 to prepare students for the arts concentrations. With rigorous training to become professional artists, this school is rated the #1 school in 2016 according to the Fraser Institute. These concentrations make the school a magnet arts school similar to Canterbury, with the exception of offering French as their main language. The concentrations offered are:
 Media & Visual Arts
 Dance (Ballet & Contemporary)
 Writing & Literature
 Theatre
 Music - Wind & Percussion
 Music - Strings
 Music - Vocal
 Cinema & Television

The Centre d'excellence artistique's concentration programs have received numerous awards and won many competitions. Every year the Harmonie De La Salle participates in Kiwanis Music Festival. They have a winning gold streak since 2009. Most recently, the Vocal Music Senior classes won the first place at the 16th National Vocal Music Contest of CBC/Radio-Canada.

Notable students
Dan Boyle - defenceman for the New York Rangers NHL hockey team (2008–2016)
Steffi DiDomenicantonio - Canadian Idol participant, season 2006
Nicolas Dromard - Singer/dancer/actor who's performed in Toronto, at the Stratford festival of Canada, in national US tours and on Broadway.
Denis Forest - Film and TV actor
Mike Ross - Public Address Announcer - Toronto Maple Leafs - actor TV, film, voice - host - AMI-audio, former host and producer NHL Home Ice, XM Satellite Radio
Patrick Leonard - Olympic Athlete - Ice Dancing (Socci 2014) - Former dancer at Russia's National Ballet

See also
List of high schools in Ontario

References

External links
 Official Web site of the school 
 Web site of the school board 

High schools in Ottawa
French-language schools in Ottawa
Educational institutions established in 1971
French-language high schools in Ontario
1971 establishments in Ontario